Pumahuacanca or Pumahuaganga (possibly from Quechua: puma cougar, puma, waqay to cry, -nqa a  suffix, "the cougar will cry") is a mountain in the Cordillera Blanca in the Andes of Peru which reaches a height of approximately . It is located in the Ancash Region, Huaraz Province, Olleros District. Pumahuacanca lies southwest of Uruashraju and southeast of Shacsha.

Pumahuacanca (Pumahuaganga) is also the name of an intermittent stream which originates near the mountain. It flows to the south.

References

Mountains of Peru
Mountains of Ancash Region